Six60 EP is the third extended play by New Zealand band Six60. The release was a wide-scale commercial success in New Zealand, debuting at number two on the New Zealand albums chart, and being one of the top-performing releases in New Zealand between 2017 and 2021.

Production 

The album was recorded at HQ, the band's newly created studio in Auckland, New Zealand.

Release 

The songs from the extended play were released weekly as singles, beginning on 13 October 2017 with "Don't Give It Up" and ending with "Up There" on 17 November, the release date of the EP.

After the release of the EP, the band embarked on The New Waves World, a world tour which included dates in Europe, finishing on 17 March 2018 in Whangārei.

At the 2018 New Zealand Music Awards, the Six60 EP won the band the Best Group and Highest Selling Album awards, while the single "Don’t Give It Up" won the Highest Selling Single and Radio Airplay Record of the Year awards. In 2022, the album was certified six times Platinum, after selling over 90,000 units.

Track listing

Credits and personnel
Credits adapted from Tidal.

Neil Baldock – engineer
Leslie Braithwaite – mixing
Andrew Chavez – engineer
Ji Fraser – guitar, songwriter
Marlon Gerbes – keyboards, guitar, producer, songwriter
David Kutch – mastering engineer
Chris Mac – bass guitar, songwriter
Eli Paewai – drums, songwriter
Printz Board – producer, songwriter
Matiu Walters – vocals, producer, songwriter

Charts

Weekly charts

Year-end charts

Certifications and sales

Release history

References

2017 EPs
Six60 albums